Alexander Campbell (28 November 1876 – 16 December 1942) was a Scottish professional golfer and golf course architect of the late 19th and early 20th century. In total, Campbell had five top-10 finishes in major championships.

Early life
Alex/Alec "Nipper" Campbell was born in Scotland on 28 November 1876, the son of Alexander Campbell and Margaret Campbell née Patterson. He had five brothers who also became golf professionals.

Golf career
Campbell was the head professional at several golf clubs, including The Country Club (Brookline, Massachusetts, 1896–1916), Baltimore Country Club (Baltimore, Maryland), Northmoor Golf Club (Celina, Ohio), Losantiville Country Club (Cincinnati, Ohio), Miami Valley Golf Club and Moraine Country Club (Dayton, Ohio). He was also a golf course architect, designing the Moraine Country Club.

In 1913, at The Country Club, he played a friendly match against Wilfrid Reid upon the Englishman's arrival in Boston to play in the 1913 U.S. Open. During his 20-year career at The Country Club, he was involved in the development of caddy Francis Ouimet as a player.

1901 U.S. Open
Campbell finished in eighth place in the 1901 U.S. Open at Myopia Hunt Club. Willie Anderson won his first of four U.S. Open titles in a playoff over Alex Smith. Campbell had rounds of 84-91-82-82=339—the high second round 91 being detrimental to this overall scoring—however he finished strongly and won $25 as his share of the purse.

1905 U.S. Open
In the 1905 U.S. Open held September 21–22, 1905, at Myopia Hunt Club, Willie Anderson won his third consecutive U.S. Open title, and his record 4th overall, by two strokes over Alex Smith. Campbell finished in sixth place, carding rounds of 82-76-80-81=319, and won $70.

1907 U.S. Open
Campbell's best finish in the U.S. Open was third in the 1907 U.S. Open, held June 20–21, 1907, at Philadelphia Cricket Club in Chestnut Hill, Pennsylvania. Alex Ross posted four sub-80 rounds to win his first U.S. Open title by two strokes over Gilbert Nicholls. Campbell played consistently good golf, posting rounds of 78-74-78-75=305, and won $100.

1912 U.S. Open
The 1912 U.S. Open was the 18th U.S. Open. The golf tournament was held August 1–2, 1912, at the Country Club of Buffalo, which is now Grover Cleveland Golf Course (the Country Club of Buffalo has since relocated to Amherst, New York). 20-year-old John McDermott successfully defended his U.S. Open title with a two-stroke victory over Tom McNamara. Campbell fired rounds of 74-77-80-71=302, finishing 8 strokes behind the winner, and won $70 for his excellent performance.

Death

Campbell died at his home on 16 December 1942 in Dayton, Ohio. He had suffered from a heart ailment for some time. He is interred in the Woodland Cemetery and Arboretum.

Results in major championships

Note: Campbell never played in the Masters Tournament or The Open Championship.

NT = No tournament
R32, R16, QF, SF = Round in which player lost in PGA Championship match play
"T" indicates a tie for a place
? = unknown
Yellow background for top-10

References

Scottish male golfers
Golf course architects
Golfers from Massachusetts
Golfers from Maryland
Golfers from Ohio
Scottish emigrants to the United States
Burials at Woodland Cemetery and Arboretum
1876 births
1942 deaths